The Toyota Camry (XV30) is a mid-size car produced by Toyota from June 2001 to January 2006. The XV30 series represented the fifth generation of the Toyota Camry in all markets outside Japan, which followed a different generational lineage. The XV30 range is split into different model codes indicative of the engine. Four-cylinder models utilize the ACV30 (front-wheel drive) and ACV35 (all-wheel drive) codes, with MCV30 (3.0-liter) and MCV31 (3.3-liter) designating the six-cylinder versions.

On August 27, 2001, for the 2002 model year, the Toyota Camry was released as a larger sedan (taking styling cues from the successful Vitz, Corolla and Solara) only, but without a station wagon for the first time. Due to station wagons losing popularity to minivans and crossover SUVs, the Camry wagon was replaced by the Sienna minivan (in North America only) and the Highlander SUV, both vehicles utilizing the Camry's platform.

Design and engineering 

Development of the XV30 began in 1997 after launch of the XV20 under chief engineer Kosaku Yamada. By 1999, 26 months ahead of scheduled production, a new design by Hiroyuki Metsugi was chosen and later frozen in July 1999 for June 2001 production. The production development process (which began in April 1999) was reduced by 10 months, from the prior XV20's 36 months to 26 months. Design patents were filed at the Japan Patent office on January 25, 2000 and registered under patent No. 1142401.

The front end of the car was relatively short, leaving a great deal of the length to the cabin, a technique adopted by compact cars. In contrast to the fairly squat XV20 Camry, the XV30 generation was a decidedly tall vehicle. It was  taller and had a  longer wheelbase than the previous model.

Two engines were available, an all-new 2.4-liter 2AZ-FE VVT-i I4 engine and a carry over 3.0-liter 1MZ-FE V6 engine.  Both engines in the United States were ULEV certified.  Any model could be equipped with a V6 or a 4-speed automatic transmission, although the manual transmission was not available on V6 models outside of Australia and New Zealand. The Camry's front suspension used MacPherson struts mounted to a front sub-frame while the rear suspension used a dual link setup also mounted to its own rear sub-frame.

For safety ABS, Vehicle Stability Control, front and rear head side curtain airbags, and front seat-mounted torso side airbags were optional.  The Insurance Institute for Highway Safety (IIHS) rated the Camry Good overall in their frontal offset crash test. In their side impact test a Good overall rating was given to models equipped with side airbags, while models without side airbags were given a Poor overall rating.

Camry Solara

Until the 2003 model year, the Camry Solara remained on the previous XV20 chassis, and received only minor styling upgrades to the front and rear ends. However, the Solara did receive the same 2.4-liter 2AZ-FE I4 engine that was available on the Camry sedan.

The second generation Camry Solara was introduced in 2003 as a 2004 model. Again, styling from the Camry was radically different, taking design cues from the Lexus SC 430.

Toyota Camry TS-01

A high-performance concept of the Toyota Camry, named the Toyota Camry TS-01 was shown at the 2005 Melbourne International Motor Show. This concept vehicle had significant performance and visual upgrades from the production Toyota Camry and hinted at the TRD Aurion.

Markets 
XV30 Camrys were manufactured in at the Tsutsumi plant in Toyota City, Japan; Toyota Australia's facility in Altona, Victoria; Toyota Motor Manufacturing Kentucky manufacturing plant in Georgetown, Kentucky, United States; and at the Toyota Gateway Plant in Chachoengsao, Thailand.  Other manufacturing facilities for their respective regional markets include locations in Malaysia, Indonesia, and Taiwan.

Japan 
The XV30 Camry was launched in Japan in September 2001. Daihatsu continued with its twin Altis model for the Japanese market. The second generation Altis was introduced in the same month as the Camry, and was available with the 2AZ-FE 2.4-litre four-cylinder engine. Visually, the Altis is very similar to the Japanese market Camry with the 4-cylinder engine. The Verossa was also sold during this model timeframe, offering Japanese buyers a well-equipped sedan with similar dimensions to the Camry, with a rear-wheel drive powertrain setup, or an optional all-wheel drive that the Camry did not offer. The Verossa was not a strong seller, and replaced by the Mark X in 2004, continuing to offer a rear-wheel drive powertrain.

North America 

US production started on July 23, 2001. In the United States, the basic CE model was dropped and the SE sport model was reintroduced. Both the LE and SE models were available with a manual transmission when equipped with the four-cylinder engine. Some of this generation Camry sold in the US are being produced at TMMK as well as at Tsutsumi Plant in Toyota, Aichi, Japan.  A Camry manufactured in Japan is denoted with a VIN starting with "JTD", as well as a small hatch on the passenger's side of the front bumper containing equipment that is compatible with Japanese towing systems; US-made models are denoted with a VIN starting with "4T1". In addition to the LE and SE trims, the top-of-the-line XLE came standard with alloy wheels, JBL premium audio system, and leather, as well as optional side airbags and Vehicle Stability Control (VSC).

The Canadian version of this Camry is slightly different from the versions sold in the United States due to the additional Child Restraint System.

In 2002, for the 2003 model year, a few new features were added including the optional, power-adjustable pedals and pedal-type parking brake for the XLE trim.

For 2004 models, the Standard and Limited Edition trims were included for the US market.  In SE models a 3.3-liter 3MZ-FE V6 replaced the smaller 3.0-liter 1MZ-FE. The passenger airbag disable feature was also added for this model year to prevent or reduce injuries to infants.

For 2005 models, Toyota introduced its refreshed Camry with new upgrades such as a chrome grille, with the SE having a unique, blackout grille. Other exterior changes are new headlight and taillight designs, redesigned front bumper, and new wheels. Interior upgrades to the Camry included a rear center head restraint, a storage bin in the door, Optitron electroluminescent gauges, steering wheel-mounted audio controls standard for all trim levels, chrome interior door handles and shift gear button, and standard leather seating on V6-powered XLE trims.  A 5-speed automatic transmission also replaced the previous 4-speed automatic and ABS became standard on all trims.

Engines

Mexico 
Toyota launched in Mexico in 2002. Trim levels were LE and XLE. The LE models had the 2.4 L 2AZ-FE whilst LE and XLE models were available with the I4, 157 hp 3.0 L 1MZ-FE V6. The previous-generation Camry was not available in Mexico; such vehicles there were often illegal imports from the United States. All vehicles had automatic transmissions.

Brazil 
In Brazil, the Camry was launched there in 2002. However, this version did not offer a 4-cylinder version; all models had a 3.0-liter V6 initially, before upgrading to the 3.3 V6 as of 2006. XLE was the sole trim level.

China 
In China, the XV30 Camry was imported from Japan and launched there in 2004. The 2.4 litre 2AZ-FE was the only engine available, paired to the 4 speed automatic gearbox. Pricing for the Camry was 336.800 yuan ($US53,270 - January 2022 exchange rate).

Australia and New Zealand

In Australia and New Zealand, the 2002 to 2006 Camry is available in five different trims: the Altise, Ateva, Sportivo, Grande (2004 onwards) and Azura. The Altise, Ateva and Sportivo are available with either the 2.4 L four-cylinder or the 3.0 L V6 engine, whilst the Grande and Azura were only available with the V6. Only the Altise and Sportivo models could be fitted with a manual transmission — all other models are equipped with a four-speed automatic transmission. In 2003, the V6-powered Altise Sport model was introduced, which is basically the Altise model with the sports suspension that was fitted on the Sportivo and Azura models and was available in manual and automatic transmission. The Australian and New Zealand Camry Sportivo corresponds roughly to the American Camry SE.

The Australian and New Zealand models were significantly different from the other Camry models around the world and had around 77% locally developed components to suit Australian and New Zealand roads and driving conditions. The brakes, body panels (which would only fit on the Australian made body and chassis), headlights, seats, radio antenna and suspension were all locally developed after 10,000 km of extensive testing in New Zealand under the supervision of Toyota engineers.

When the revised range was launched in Australia and New Zealand in September 2004, the Grande model was reintroduced which, together with the Azura model, were the top-of-the-range models. The Grande however was fitted with the standard suspension rather than the sports suspension as fitted on the Azura model. The Grande and Azura models have Satellite Navigation (GPS) as standard equipment, and were the first Toyota models in Australia to be fitted with the new Toyota Link system. The Toyota Link system is a state-of-the-art satellite and mobile SMS GSM communications system that gives the driver access to roadside assistance and emergency help via the electrochromatic rear view mirror. In August 2005, the Altise Sport model was reintroduced (V6 auto only) together with Altise Limited (four-cylinder and V6) that has additional features. The Ateva model had an interior upgrade to leather trim and rear passenger air conditioning vents. The Altise was repositioned as a fleet model and the manual transmission was no longer available on V6 Sportivo models from January 2006 production. Automatic Camrys in Australia still used the dated four-speed because it retained the 3.0 V6 engine.

A number of milestones were achieved with this generation's Camry in Australia. The one millionth Camry (Black Azura) built in Australia and 10 millionth Camry worldwide rolled off the production line at Altona in September 2004. In May 2006, Toyota Australia exported the 500,000th Camry to New Zealand, in recognition of the relationship between Toyota Australia and Toyota New Zealand. More than 90% of Australian Camry exports are left-hand drive vehicles to Middle East countries including Saudi Arabia, Kuwait, Bahrain, Oman, Qatar and the United Arab Emirates. The overseas demand for the Australian-made Camry is still running at record levels, despite the release of an all-new model in August 2006.

Middle East

In the Middle East, the fifth generation Camry is available in 4 variants: XLi, GLi, Touring and Grande V6. The XLi trim  comes reasonably equipped and is a common choice for taxis and is the volume seller. The Camry weathers extreme heat well and is often preferred by fleet buyers looking for reliability. The GLi trim adds alloy wheels, wooden panel interior and foglamps. The Touring and Grande trims come with a 3.0 LT V6 engine. The Australian-made Camry were one of the top-selling passenger vehicles in the Middle Eastern region.

Additionally, fifth generation Camrys were very popular in Saudi Arabia for "Tafheet" or Arab Drifting. The main objective is to drift the Camry sideways along the road (usually a long stretch of road or freeway), while sometimes even being in the flow of traffic. This is highly dangerous, as there have been instances
of the rear suspension components failing and a rear wheel being lost.

Taiwan and Southeast Asia

The Camry in Taiwan and Southeast Asia of this generation looked very similar to other versions, but the front end had a "thicker" grille and larger, all-white, differently shaped headlights. The reverse lights were moved onto the trunk above the added rear fog lights and were somewhat similar to the lights on a second generation Avalon's trunk. The older models from 2002 to 2003 had tail lights with a white streak across them, while models 2004 and later did not.

Indonesia 
In Indonesia, the fifth generation Camry was launched in July 2002 in two trim levels: 2.4 G with either 5-speed manual or 4-speed automatic transmission and 3.0 V with 4-speed automatic transmission. The facelifted version was released in June 2004.

Philippines 
In the Philippines, the fifth generation Camry was initially introduced in 2002 with 2.0- and 2.4-liter engines, with 4-speed automatic and no manual transmission. Compared to the US version, this had a different front end design (grille and headlights), as well as inner taillight garnishes. The facelifted version, which came out in around November 2004 saw off the 2.0-liter and introduced the 3.0-liter V6 with 5-speed automatic along with new colors and wheel design.

Vietnam 
In Vietnam, the fifth generation Camry was launched in August 2002 with two versions 2.4G and 3.0V. The 3.0V version has equipment such as wood and leather interior materials, automatic air conditioning, electrically adjustable rear seats, individual lights, cup holders and electric rear window blinds (automatically open when reverse gear). In addition, in the standard equipment list, there are remote control and anti-theft central door locks, ceiling storage boxes, rear glass antennas... Vehicle safety includes: System Brakes with large discs on all 4 wheels are supported by ABS anti-lock mechanism, EBD electronic brake force distribution function and BA emergency brake support. The wide field of vision at both front and rear also increases the effectiveness of the active safety system. The list of passive safety devices includes: 2 airbags, seat belts, front seats designed to prevent head and neck injuries, and pedals that automatically retract in the event of a collision. In addition, the GOA body style will absorb kinetic energy in an accident, limiting injury to the driver and passengers. The facelifted Camry was introduced in July 2004 and is powered by a 212 hp (3.0 V6) VVT-i engine. The headlights can automatically change the projection angle when entering uneven terrain.

References 

XV30
Cars introduced in 2001
Cars discontinued in 2006
Motor vehicles manufactured in the United States